The 1995 Kremlin Cup was a men's tennis tournament played onindoor carpet courts. It was the 6th edition of the Kremlin Cup, and was part of the World Series of the 1995 ATP Tour. It took place at the Olympic Stadium in Moscow, Russia, from 6 November through 12 November 1995. Unseeded Carl-Uwe Steeb won the singles title.

Finals

Singles

 Carl-Uwe Steeb defeated  Daniel Vacek, 7–6(7–5), 3–6, 7–6(8–6)
 It was Steeb's 1st singles title of the year and 3rd and last of his career.

Doubles

 Byron Black /  Jared Palmer defeated  Tommy Ho /  Brett Steven, 6–4, 3–6, 6–3
 It was Black's 2nd title of the year and 11th title overall. It was Palmers's 4th title of the year and 10th title overall.

References

External links
 Official website
 ITF tournament edition details

Kremlin Cup
Kremlin Cup
Kremlin Cup
Kremlin Cup
Kremlin Cup